The  was a conservative political party in Japan. Existing from 1954 to 1955, the party was founded by Ichirō Hatoyama, former foreign minister Mamoru Shigemitsu and future Prime Minister Nobusuke Kishi. The party was formed on 24 November 1954, by merging Ichiro Hatoyama's group which left the Liberal Party in 1953, and the Shigemitsu-led Kaishintō party. On 15 November 1955, the Japan Democrats merged with the Liberals to form the modern Liberal Democratic Party.

Electoral results

House of Representatives

See also 
:Category:Democratic Party (Japan, 1954) politicians

References

Defunct political parties in Japan
Political parties established in 1954
Political parties disestablished in 1955
1954 establishments in Japan
1955 disestablishments in Japan